Jean-Raymond Tournoux (15 August 1914 in Les Rousses – 23 November 1984 in Paris), was a French parliamentary journalist, writer and historian. Fascinated by Pétain and de Gaulle, Tournoux devoted most of his work to them. He became known as "the historian of secrecy" for his meticulous documentation, his storing of small snippets of conversation, and his revealing of "great secrets of contemporary history".

Biography 
Son of commander Léon Tournoux and Aline Gauthier, Jean-Raymond Tournoux was born in Les Rousses. After completing his secondary studies at the high school of Belfort, Tournoux studied journalism. He began his career as an editorial secretary at the République de l'Est (1934–1939) and then worked as a radio editor at the Radiodiffusion Française from 1941 to 1946 while collaborating with various daily and weekly newspapers such as L'Eclair comtois, L'Epoque, Marianne and L'Actualité économique et financière. Head of department at Libération and then at Ce Matin until 1950, he then worked as an editorialist at l'Information (1950–1955), Combat, Progrès de Lyon (1945–1962) and Figaro (1976–1980) and became political director of Paris-Match from 1964 to 1976. During his tenure as director of the contemporary history collection at the Plon bookstore, he wrote several works on the politics of the Fourth and Fifth Republics and also published historical columns in the newspaper Le Monde and La Revue des Deux Mondes.

During the Second World War, following his demobilization, he joined the Zone libre and became a press correspondent for the Vichy government. As a journalist for the Vichy radio station and for La Légion, Marshal Pétain awarded him the Order of the Francisque. His proximity to the Marshal, whom he accompanied on his travels, interested intelligence services. In May 1949, he was awarded the Croix de Guerre for his work in an underground intelligence network in Andalucia.

In 1981, he became a member of the Institut de France, by being admitted to the Academy of Moral and Political Sciences.

Tournoux married Francine Lambert in 1939. Together, they had six children: Noëlle (born 1941), Roland (born 1942), Mireille (born 1945), Renaud (born 1946), Frédéric (born 1951), and Aude (born 1956). Four years after the death of his wife in 1971, he married Jacqueline Heiny. He died on November 23, 1984, in Paris.

Awards and distinctions 
His work has been rewarded with numerous distinctions:

 Croix de Guerre (1949)
 Prix du Nouveau Cercle for Pétain et de Gaulle
 Grand prix du Festival international du Livre (1969)
 Historia Prize (1980)
 Legion of Honour
 Order of the National Economy
 Order of the Black Star

Bibliography 

 Carnets secrets de la politique, Plon, 1958
 Secrets d'État, Plon, 1960
 L'Histoire secrète. La Cagoule, le Front populaire, Vichy, Londres, Plon, 1962
 Pétain et de Gaulle, Plon, 1964
 La Tragédie du général, Plon, 1967
 Le Mois de mai du général. Le livre blanc des évènements, Plon, 1969
 Le Tourment et la fatalité. Tout finit par se savoir, Plon, 1974
 Journal secret. Une année pas comme les autres, Plon, 1975
 Le Feu et la cendre. Les années politiques du général de Gaulle, Plon, 1979
 Pétain et la France, Plon, 1980
 Le Royaume d'Otto, Flammarion, 1982
 France, ton café fout le camp. L'engrenage de la démocratie populaire, Flammarion, 1982

References 

1914 births
1984 deaths
French journalists